Charles Elworthy (born 1961) is a New Zealand economist and social scientist. He is a son of Sir Peter Elworthy.

Academic and professional activities 
Elworthy is a Visiting Business Fellow at the Smith School of Enterprise and the Environment at the University of Oxford, and the Head of Research at the Map of Agriculture.  He has taught as a professor at Chulalongkorn University (Thailand) and the University of Szczecin (Poland), and is a Privatdozent at the Free University of Berlin (Germany).

Elworthy's research approach was fundamentally shaped while at Cambridge through Douglass North’s supervisions on the New Institutional Economics.  This was complemented by an introduction to alternative psychological models and their implications for political behaviour and international relations at Yale.  These foundations were combined in his doctoral research on the evolutionary foundations of human behaviour and his later work on the interaction between governance structures and behaviour.

In his dissertation, published in 1993 in Berlin, Elworthy created the model of Homo biologicus which explains human behaviour in terms of evolutionary theory and phylogenetic and ontogenetic development. Homo biologicus is linked to, but extends, the economic Homo economicus model, which describes man as a rational and self-interested being.  The core hypothesis is derived from evolutionary psychology, and proposes that human psychological processes were shaped by natural and sexual selection to solve evolutionarily relevant problems. Some of these relate to somatic effort, and are economic in nature, while others relate to reproductive and social behaviour which are inexplicable within a conventional Homo economicus paradigm. Elworthy's theory stands in the tradition of authors like E. O. Wilson or Richard Dawkins, who are controversial among social scientists and frequently criticised for their alleged biologism. In later academic work Elworthy examines on the interactions between social institutions and human psychology and the behaviour that results. His habilitation analyses constitutional developments in New Zealand, and their enabling role in the dramatic liberalisation from 1984 to 1993.

Elworthy's recent research has concentrated on the governance and usage of natural resources.   Elworthy is currently helping create a "Map of Agriculture", a GIS application which provides financial returns, production yields and environmental information about agriculture around the world.

Other 
Following his experience at the COP15 Copenhagen climate conference Elworthy established the Bhuu organisation as an example of ecological entrepreneurship. The objective was to develop simple devices which transmitted environmental measurements to a central database via the internet. The intention was that the data could then be visualised and analysed and made available to both the original collectors and the general public. The Bhuu initiative itself has been overtaken by other technologies, but the intention of providing better economic and environmental information to enable better decision-making remains part of Elworthy's objectives.

Elworthy is Director of the European Academy charitable organisation in Schloss Wartin. The Collegium Wartinum Foundation supports the preservation of this manor house and its use as a cultural, artistic, and scientific center in the Uckermark.

Selected publications 
 van Beers, Rik, Sander Bierman, Charles Elworthy, Dane Rook and Jérôme Schoumann "Farmland investment: Reaping the rewards of illiquidity?" VBA beleggingsprofessionals, Nr 114 (Summer 2013).
 Elworthy, Charles: Homo Biologicus: An Evolutionary Model for the Human Sciences. Duncker & Humblot, Berlin 1993,  
 Elworthy, Charles: The Reciprocal Influence of Institutions and Policies: The Evolution of Governance Structures in New Zealand, 1840–1993 Habilitationsshrift, Otto Suhr Institut für Politikwissenschaft, Freie Universität Berlin.  February 2001.
 Elworthy, Charles: Evolutionary Psychology. The Appropriate Disciplinary Link between Evolutionary Theory and the Social Sciences. In: Dennen/Smillie/Wilson (eds.): The Darwinian Heritage and Sociobiology. Praeger, Westport 1999,

References

External links 
 Charles Elworthy's academic Academia.edu website
 
 Schloss Wartin website in English and German

1961 births
Living people
Charles Elworthy (scientist)
Academic staff of the University of Szczecin
Academic staff of the Free University of Berlin
20th-century New Zealand educators
New Zealand expatriates in Thailand
New Zealand expatriates in Germany
20th-century New Zealand economists
New Zealand expatriates in Poland
21st-century New Zealand  economists
Charles